The 2015 Coca-Cola GM was the 45th edition of the Greenlandic Men's Football Championship. The final round was held in Qasigiannguit from August 3 to 8. It was won by B-67 Nuuk for the fourth consecutive time and for the eleventh time in its history.

Qualifying stage

North Greenland

Disko Bay
All matches were played in Ilulissat.

NB Some match results are unavailable.NB Kugsak-45 qualified for the final Round as hosts.

Central Greenland
All matches were played in Sisimiut.

East Greenland

A.T.A.-60 qualified for the final Round.

NB A.T.A.-60 withdrew for financial reasons and were replaced by Siumut Amerdlok Kunuk (Central Greenland runners-up).

South Greenland
All matches were played in Narsaq.

Final round

Pool 1

Pool 2

Playoffs

Semi-finals

Seventh-place match

Fifth-place match

Third-place match

Final

See also
Football in Greenland
Football Association of Greenland
Greenland national football team
Greenlandic Men's Football Championship

References

Greenlandic Men's Football Championship seasons
Green
Green
Foot